Kinmundy Township is located in Marion County, Illinois, USA. At the 2010 census, its population was 1,186 and it contained 542 housing units.

Kinmundy is believed to be named after a place in Scotland.

Geography
Kinmundy Township (T4N R3E) is centered at 38°47'N 88°51'W (38.778, -88.983). It is traversed northeast–southwest by Interstate Route 57, State Route 37 and the East Fork of the Kaskaskia River. The city of Kinmundy is located near the center of the township.

Demographics

Adjacent townships 
 Lone Grove Township, Fayette County (north)
 LaClede Township, Fayette County (northeast)
 Meacham Township (east)
 Omega Township (southeast)
 Alma Township (south)
 Tonti Township (southwest)
 Foster Township (west)
 Wilberton Township, Fayette County (northwest)

References

External links
US Census
City-data.com
Illinois State Archives

Townships in Marion County, Illinois
Townships in Illinois